Elizeu Araújo de Melo Batista (born 28 May 1989), commonly known as Elizeu, is a Brazilian professional footballer who plays as a right back for Malaysian club Petaling Jaya City FC.

Career
He played in the Internacional B.

Career statistics
(Correct )

References

1989 births
Living people
Brazilian footballers
Sport Club do Recife players
Botafogo de Futebol e Regatas players
C.D. Nacional players
Esporte Clube Vitória players
Associação Atlética Ponte Preta players
Primeira Liga players
Brazilian expatriate footballers
Brazilian expatriate sportspeople in Portugal
Expatriate footballers in Portugal
Association football midfielders
Association football fullbacks
Sportspeople from Recife